The Last Boy Scout is a 1991 American buddy action comedy film directed by Tony Scott, written by Shane Black, and produced by Joel Silver. The film stars Bruce Willis, Damon Wayans, Chelsea Field, Noble Willingham, Taylor Negron and Danielle Harris. The film was released in the United States on December 13, 1991.

Plot 
During halftime at a televised football game, L.A. Stallions running back Billy Cole receives a phone call from a mysterious man named Milo, who warns him to win the game or he will be killed. Cole ingests PCP and in a drug-induced rage, brings a gun onto the field, shooting three opposing players to reach the end zone before shooting himself in the head. Meanwhile, private investigator Joseph Hallenbeck, a disgraced former Secret Service agent who was once a national hero for saving the president from an assassination attempt, discovers that his wife Sarah is having an affair with his friend and business partner, Mike Matthews. Mike gives Joe an assignment to act as bodyguard for a stripper named Cory. Mike is then killed by a car bomb outside Joe's house.

That night at a local strip club, Joe is approached by Cory's boyfriend, former Stallions quarterback Jimmy Dix, who was banned from the league on gambling charges and alleged drug abuse. After an argument between Joe and Jimmy, an annoyed Jimmy takes Cory from the stage while she is performing. Joe plans to wait outside, where he is knocked out by a team of hitmen. Jimmy and Cory leave the bar in separate cars while Joe overpowers the single hitman left to dispatch him. When Cory is struck from behind and stops to confront the other driver, she is killed by the hitmen. Jimmy is fired upon and pinned down, but is saved by Joe.

At Cory's house, Jimmy and Joe find a taped phone conversation between Senator Calvin Baynard, who is leading a congressional investigation into gambling in sports, and Stallions owner Sheldon Marcone. When the tape is ruined in Joe's faulty car stereo, Jimmy realizes that Cory tried using the tape against Marcone to put Jimmy back on the team, prompting Marcone to send the hitmen. Joe saves Jimmy from another car bomb, and tricks two hitmen into blowing themselves up. However, the explosion destroys the remaining evidence.

Joe reveals to Jimmy that when he was in the Secret Service, he witnessed Baynard torturing a woman in a hotel room and assaulted the senator to intercept the attack. Baynard retaliated by having Joe fired from the Secret Service for refusing to cover up the incident. At Joe's house, Jimmy meets Joe's abrasive daughter Darian. When Joe catches Jimmy attempting to use cocaine in the bathroom, Joe kicks him out. As Jimmy leaves, Darian asks him to sign a football trading card, stating that Joe was a fan of Jimmy's and never watched another game after he was banned from the league. He leaves her with the signed card, "To the daughter of the last Boy Scout."

Learning of Mike's affair with Sarah, the police assume Joe killed him and move to make an arrest. Milo, Marcone's top henchman, captures Joe first and shoots a detective using Joe's gun. Marcone explains to Joe that he has been buying Senate votes to legalize sports gambling, but that Baynard tried to blackmail Marcone for $6 million. Aware of Joe's history with Baynard, Marcone explains it would be cheaper to kill the senator and frame Joe for the murder. Joe is taken to a wooded area and forced to hand a briefcase full of money to Baynard's bodyguards, and Marcone's men surreptitiously switch it with a briefcase containing a bomb. Joe is rescued by Jimmy and Darian, and acquires both briefcases after running the bodyguards and Milo off the road. However, Milo survives and while Darian is left to wait for the police, she is abducted by Milo.

Heading to the stadium to rescue Darian, Joe and Jimmy are captured and escorted to Marcone's office. Jimmy creates a diversion, allowing them to fight their way free. Realizing Milo will attempt to shoot Baynard, Joe goes after Milo while sending Jimmy to warn the senator. Grabbing the game ball, Jimmy throws it at Baynard, knocking him down just as Milo starts to open fire. Joe knocks Milo to the edge of the stadium light platform, where SWAT officers shoot him before he falls into the moving rotor blades of a helicopter. The suitcase of money is recovered and Marcone, having escaped with the rigged briefcase, is killed when he opens it at his estate. The next day, Joe and Sarah reconcile, and Joe and Jimmy decide to become partners while having ideas of one-liners.

Cast

Production

Development and writing 
The film was based on an original script by Shane Black. He wrote the script after having taken a two-year break from writing, triggered in part by the end of a relationship. The Geffen Film Company outbid other companies, paying a record $1.75 million for the script, with over a $1 million guaranteed up front. Black later recalled:
I was busy mourning my life and, in many ways, the loss of my first real love. I didn’t feel much like doing anything except smoking cigarettes and reading paperbacks. All things come around. Time passed and eventually I sat down and transformed some of that bitterness into a character, the central focus of a private eye story which became The Last Boy Scout. Writing that script was a very cathartic experience, one of the best experiences I’ve ever had. I spent so much time alone working on that. Days which I wouldn’t speak. Three, four days where I maybe said a couple words. It was a wonderfully intense time where my focus was better than it’s ever been. And I was rewarded so handsomely ($1.75 million) for that script, it felt like a vindication and like I was back on track.

Roger Ebert, commenting on the script, said "The original screenplay for The Last Boy Scout set a record for its purchase price; that was probably because of the humor of the locker-room dialogue, since the plot itself could have been rewritten out of the Lethal Weapon movies by any film school grad."

Joel Silver was guaranteed $1 million to produce. Silver said in a Q&A for The Nice Guys (2016) that Shane Black's original title was Die Hard. Silver asked if he could take the title for a project he was working on at the time called Nothing Lasts Forever, which eventually became Die Hard (1988).

Shane Black and Tony Scott both said in later years how the original script was far better than the final film.

Filming 
The Last Boy Scout was filmed in 90 days between March 11 and June 9, 1991. The movie had a very troubled production. Conflict and arguments flared between Joel Silver, Bruce Willis and Tony Scott. Although they partner up in the film, Willis and Damon Wayans hated working with each other. Silver was described as "insane, with long, horrible fits of sanity,” and was compared to a fighter pilot riding as a passenger. “As soon as you hit a little bit of turbulence, he’s right away going to throw the guy out of the window and take over the steering.” Taylor Negron, who played Milo, described Silver as extremely hands-on in every aspect of the production.

Assistant director James Skotchdopole attributed the tension on-set to an “overabundance of alpha males on that project. Bruce was at the height of his stardom, so was Joel, so was Tony and so was Shane. There were a lot of people who had a lot of opinions about what to do. There were some heated, early-Nineties, testosterone charged personalities on the line. It was a ‘charged environment,’ shall we say.” Writer Shane Black had to wrestle with the script. “I was forced to do more rewriting on that movie than on anything else I’ve done. There was tremendous pressure from the studio to get Bruce Willis and have this be a follow-up to Die Hard. He was reluctant, and rightly so: ‘This whole movie is about me saving my wife. I just did that in Die Hard.’ So they said, ‘OK, let’s minimize the wife and, and while we’re at it, add a big finale.' There was a general pressure to somehow make it bigger.”

More problems emerged during post-production, when the original cut of the film turned out be a "borderline unwatchable workprint." Different editors were hired in an attempt to address Scott's tendency for filming excessive coverage with multiple cameras. Editor Mark Helfrich described sorting through "mountains of raw material" to edit the first cut: "There was more footage shot for The Last Boy Scout than on any film I had ever worked on." He recalled with incredulity that the work of previous editors appeared to have been rejected, taken apart and put back into the daily reels: "There were still splices all over the place." Expert action movie editor Mark Goldblatt, who also worked on the film, recalls it as one of the most painful and frustrating experiences of his entire career, and refuses to discuss it in interviews, although he did mention in a podcast interview that several other editors were hired and then fired before him, and that Warner Bros. began testing the movie before it was completely finished. Studio executives fretted about the expanding budget, while less-than-enthusiastic reactions from a test screening audience, as well as the unlikeable character played by Willis, did little to allay these concerns.

When editor Stuart Baird was hired, the film finally took a positive turn. Baird had been brought in to help re-edit other troubled productions, including Tango & Cash (1989) and Demolition Man (1993). Some later cuts were done with the film's graphic scenes after it was originally rated NC-17, which explains quick-cut edits in some of the death scenes in the film.

Music 
The film's score was composed and conducted by Michael Kamen (who also scored Hudson Hawk that year), his only work for Tony Scott. Bill Medley performed the song "Friday Night's A Great Night For Football," written by Steve Dorff and John Bettis, on screen during the opening credits (the song is also reprised over the end titles); the song was released as a CD single by Curb Records.

On August 25, 2015, La-La Land Records released a limited edition soundtrack album featuring most of Kamen's score, plus Medley's song.

Reception

Box office 
The film under-performed expectations given the star power and hype surrounding the then record price paid for the screenplay by Shane Black ($1.75 million). It grossed $7.9 million in its opening weekend, and the total gross in the United States and Canada was $59.5 million. Internationally, the film grossed $55 million for a worldwide gross of $114.5 million. Reviews were mixed, and some critics cited the Christmas time release for such a violent film as a reason for its somewhat underwhelming box office. Although the film was not a blockbuster, it helped Bruce Willis recover his star status after the disastrous Hudson Hawk and became hugely popular in the video rental market.

Critical response 

The site's critical consensus reads: "The Last Boy Scout is as explosive, silly, and fun as it does represent the decline of the buddy-cop genre." On Metacritic the film has a weighted average score of 52 out of 100, based on 22 critics, indicating "mixed or average reviews". Audiences polled by CinemaScore gave the film an average grade of "B+" on an A+ to F scale.

Roger Ebert gave the film three stars out of four, saying it was "a superb example of what it is: a glossy, skillful, cynical, smart, utterly corrupt and vilely misogynistic action thriller." Owen Gleiberman praised it as "a cheerfully disreputable buddy thriller that also happens to be one of the most entertaining movies of the season ... [and] gives the actors room to stretch out." Variety described the plot as "a haze of barely connected story lines about political corruption, pro-football, gambling, infidelity, and blackmail [where] all the questions are answered by another car chase, smashing someone in the face or shooting someone in the forehead." In a highly critical review, Desson Howe of The Washington Post called it "the filmic equivalent of a hate crime. ... It's mindless, anti-civilization formula for boys who can't get enough."

Retrospective reviews praised the writing, the direction, and the chemistry between Willis and Wayans, and some critics noted it as one of the best films in Scott's catalog. In 2022, Alan Sepinwall from Rolling Stone included The Last Boy Scout on The Best of Bruce Willis: 10 Memorables TV and Movie Performances and said: "The neo-noir thriller The Last Boy Scout is on some level (also) trash  — bookended by wildly over-the-top action sequences at football stadiums — elevated not only by director Tony Scott’s self-awareness of how ridiculous it all is, but by the sheer force of Willis’ performance as a disgraced Secret Service agent turned seedy private detective"

Accolades 

The film was nominated for two MTV Movie Awards.

 Best Action Sequence – For the helicopter blade sequence
 Best On-Screen Duo – Bruce Willis & Damon Wayans

References

External links 

 
 
 
 
 

1991 films
1991 action comedy films
1990s buddy comedy films
1990s buddy cop films
1990s Christmas comedy films
1990s sports films
Adultery in films
American action comedy films
American buddy comedy films
American buddy cop films
American Christmas comedy films
American detective films
American football films
1990s English-language films
Films about assassinations
Films directed by Tony Scott
Films produced by Joel Silver
Films scored by Michael Kamen
Films with screenplays by Shane Black
Films set in Los Angeles
Films shot in California
Films shot in Los Angeles
Murder–suicide in films
Silver Pictures films
The Geffen Film Company films
Warner Bros. films
1990s American films